This is the current list of Olympic records in speed skating.

Men's records
♦ denotes a performance that is also a current world record. Statistics are correct as of 11 February 2022.

Women's records

Note

See also
 List of world records in speed skating
 List of Olympic records in short track speed skating

References

Speed skating
Records
Speed skating records
Speed skating-related lists